Lee David Flynn (born 4 September 1973, in Hampstead) is an English football defender who plays for AFC Sudbury.

Career
He started his career in non-League football by signing for Romford in 1991. He then moved to Hendon before being snapped up by then Football Conference side Hayes in 1995, where he played 145 games, scoring 18 goals.

In January 2001, after six-years with Hayes, he transferred to Third Division side Barnet, making his league debut on 13 January 2001 in a 2–1 win at home to York City. He was a regular in the side until the end of the season, when Barnet were relegated to the Conference following a 3–2 defeat at home to relegation rivals Torquay United on the final day of the season.

He remained with Barnet until May 2003 when he joined Stevenage Borough. In 2004, he moved to Dagenham & Redbridge, but found his opportunities limited and was loaned out to St Albans City and Cambridge City. He impressed during his loan spell at St Albans and was signed on a permanent deal in March 2006.

Flynn joined Thurrock after leaving the Saints in March 2007. He went on to sign for Isthmian League Division One North club Grays Athletic in June 2011. Flynn played for Grays for three seasons, including their promotion to the Isthmian League Premier Division and spent a season as assistant-manager from 2013–14. He made a total of 125 appearances for Grays, scoring seven goals.

Flynn joined AFC Sudbury at the start of the 2014/15 Isthmian League Division One North season, and scored his first goal for AFC in a 3–3 draw at home to Thamesmead Town F.C.

References

External links

1973 births
Living people
English footballers
Association football defenders
Romford F.C. players
Hayes F.C. players
Barnet F.C. players
Stevenage F.C. players
Dagenham & Redbridge F.C. players
St Albans City F.C. players
Thurrock F.C. players
Hendon F.C. players
Grays Athletic F.C. players
A.F.C. Sudbury players
English Football League players
National League (English football) players
Isthmian League players